Rotational diffusion is the rotational movement which acts upon any object such as particles, molecules, atoms when present in a fluid, by random changes in their orientations.
Whilst the directions and intensities of these changes are statistically random, they do not arise randomly and are instead the result of interactions between particles. One example occurs in colloids, where relatively large insoluble particles are suspended in a greater amount of fluid. The changes in orientation occur from collisions between the particle and the many molecules forming the fluid surrounding the particle, which each transfer  kinetic energy to the particle, and as such can be considered random due to the varied speeds and amounts of fluid molecules incident on each individual particle at any given time.

The analogue to translational diffusion which determines the particle's position in space, rotational diffusion randomises the orientation of any particle it acts on. 
Anything in a solution will experience rotational diffusion, from the microscopic scale where individual atoms may have an effect on each other, to the macroscopic scale.

Applications

Rotational diffusion has multiple applications in chemistry and physics, and is heavily involved in many biology based fields. For example, protein-protein interaction is a vital step in the communication of biological signals. In order to communicate, the proteins must both come into contact with each other and be facing the appropriate way to interact with each other's binding site, which relies on the proteins ability to rotate.
As an example concerning physics, rotational Brownian motion in astronomy can be used to explain the orientations of the orbital planes of binary stars, as well as the seemingly random spin axes of supermassive black holes.

The random re-orientation of molecules (or larger systems) is an important process for many biophysical probes. Due to the equipartition theorem, larger molecules re-orient more slowly than do smaller objects and, hence, measurements of the rotational diffusion constants can give insight into the overall mass and its distribution within an object. Quantitatively, the mean square of the angular velocity about each of an object's principal axes is inversely proportional to its moment of inertia about that axis. Therefore, there should be three rotational diffusion constants - the eigenvalues of the rotational diffusion tensor - resulting in five rotational time constants. If two eigenvalues of the diffusion tensor are equal, the particle diffuses as a spheroid with two unique diffusion rates and three time constants. And if all eigenvalues are the same, the particle diffuses as a sphere with one time constant. The diffusion tensor may be determined from the Perrin friction factors, in analogy with the Einstein relation of translational diffusion, but often is inaccurate and direct measurement is required.

The rotational diffusion tensor may be determined experimentally through fluorescence anisotropy, flow birefringence, dielectric spectroscopy, NMR relaxation and other biophysical methods sensitive to picosecond or slower rotational processes. In some techniques such as fluorescence it may be very difficult to characterize the full diffusion tensor, for example measuring two diffusion rates can sometimes be possible when there is a great difference between them, e.g., for very long, thin ellipsoids such as certain viruses. This is however not the case of the extremely sensitive, atomic resolution technique of NMR relaxation that can be used to fully determine the rotational diffusion tensor to very high precision.

Relation to translational diffusion 

thumb|The standard translational model of Brownian motion

Much like translational diffusion in which particles in one area of high concentration slowly spread position through random walks until they are near-equally distributed over the entire space, in rotational diffusion, over long periods of time the directions which these particles face will spread until they follow a completely random distribution with a near-equal amount facing in all directions. As impacts from surrounding particles rarely, if ever, occur directly in the centre of mass of a 'target' particle, each impact will occur off-centre and as such it is important to note that the same collisions that cause translational diffusion cause rotational diffusion as some of the impact energy is transferred to translational kinetic energy and some is transferred into torque.

Rotational version of Fick's law

A rotational version of Fick's law of diffusion can be defined. Let each rotating molecule be associated with a unit vector ; for example,  might represent the orientation of an electric or magnetic dipole moment.

The rotational version of Fick's law states

.

This partial differential equation (PDE) may be solved by expanding f(θ, φ, t) in spherical harmonics  for which the mathematical identity holds

.

Thus, the solution of the PDE may be written

,

where Clm are constants fitted to the initial distribution and the time constants equal

.

Two-dimensional rotational diffusion 

A sphere rotating around a fixed axis will rotate in two dimensions only and can be viewed from above the fixed axis as a circle. In this example, a sphere which is fixed on the vertical axis rotates around that axis only, meaning that the particle can have a θ value of 0 through 360 degrees, or 2π Radians, before having a net rotation of 0 again.

These directions can be placed onto a graph which covers the entirety of the possible positions for the face to be at relative to the starting point, through 2π radians, starting with -π radians through 0 to π radians. Assuming all particles begin with single orientation of 0, the first measurement of directions taken will resemble a delta function at 0 as all particles will be at their starting, or 0th, position and therefore create an infinitely steep single line. Over time, the increasing amount of measurements taken will cause a spread in results; the initial measurements will see a thin peak form on the graph as the particle can only move slightly in a short time. Then as more time passes, the chance for the molecule to rotate further from its starting point increases which widens the peak, until enough time has passed that the measurements will be evenly distributed across all possible directions.

The distribution of orientations will reach a point where they become uniform as they all randomly disperse to be nearly equal in all directions. This can be visualized in two ways.

  For a single particle with multiple measurements taken over time. A particle which has an area designated as its face pointing in the starting orientation, starting at a time t0 will begin with an orientation distribution resembling a single line as it is the only measurement. Each successive measurement at time greater than t0 will widen the peak as the particle will have had more time to rotate away from the starting position.
  For multiple particles measured once long after the first measurement. The same case can be made with a large number of molecules, all starting at their respective 0th orientation. Assuming enough time has passed to be much greater than t0, the molecules may have fully rotated if the forces acting on them require, and a single measurement shows they are near-to-evenly distributed.

Basic equations 
For rotational diffusion about a single axis, the mean-square angular deviation in time  is
 ,

where  is the rotational diffusion coefficient (in units of radians2/s). 
The angular drift velocity  in response to an external torque  (assuming that the flow stays non-turbulent and that inertial effects can be neglected) is given by
 ,

where  is the frictional drag coefficient. The relationship between the rotational diffusion coefficient and the rotational frictional drag coefficient is given by the Einstein relation (or Einstein–Smoluchowski relation):  
,

These relationships are in complete analogy to translational diffusion.

The rotational frictional drag coefficient for a sphere of radius  is 
 

where  is the dynamic (or shear) viscosity.

The rotational diffusion of spheres, such as nanoparticles, may deviate from what is expected when in complex environments, such as in polymer solutions or gels. This deviation can be explained by the formation of a depletion layer around the nanoparticle.

Langevin dynamics 

Collisions with the surrounding fluid molecules will create a fluctuating torque on the sphere due to the varied speeds, numbers, and directions of impact. When trying to rotate a sphere via an externally applied torque, there will be a systematic drag resistance to rotation. With these two facts combined, it is possible to write the Langevin-like equation:

Where: 
L is the angular momentum.
  is torque.
I is the moment of inertia about the rotation axis.
t is the time.
t0 is the start time.
θ is the angle between the orientation at t0 and any time after, t.
ζr is the rotational friction coefficient.
TB(t) is the fluctuating Brownian torque at time t.
The overall Torque on the particle will be the difference between:

This equation is the rotational version of Newtons second equation of motion. For example, in standard translational terms, a rocket will experience a boosting force from the engine whilst simultaneously experiencing a resistive force from the air it is travelling through. The same can be said for an object which is rotating.

Due to the random nature of rotation of the particle, the average Brownian torque is equal in both directions of rotation. symbolised as:

This means the equation can be averaged to get:

Which is to say that the first derivative with respect to time of the average Angular momentum is equal to the negative of the Rotational friction coefficient divided by the moment of inertia, all multiplied by the average of the angular momentum.

.

For a sphere of mass m, uniform density ρ and radius a, the moment of inertia is:

.

As mentioned above, the rotational drag is given by the Stokes friction for rotation:

Combining all of the equations and formula from above, we get:

 
where:
  is the momentum relaxation time
η is the viscosity of the Liquid the sphere is in.

Example: Spherical particle in water 

Let's say there is a virus which can be modelled as a perfect sphere with the following conditions:
 Radius (a) of 100 nanometres, a = 10−7m.
 Density ρ = 1500 kg  m−3.
 Orientation originally facing in a direction denoted by π.
 Suspended in water.
 Water has a viscosity of  η  =  8.9 × 10−4 Pa·s at  25 ° C 
Assume uniform mass and density throughout the particle

First, the mass of the virus particle can be calculated:

From this, we now know all the variables to calculate moment of inertia:

Simultaneous to this, we can also calculate the rotational drag:

Combining these equations we get:

As the SI units for Pascal are  the units in the answer can be reduced to read:

For this example, the decay time of the virus is in the order of nanoseconds.

Smoluchowski description of rotation 

To write the Smoluchowski equation for a particle rotating in two dimensions, we introduce a probability density P(θ, t) to find the vector u at an angle θ and time t.
This can be done by writing a continuity equation:

 
where the current can be written as:

 
Which can be combined to give the rotational diffusion equation:

 
We can express the current in terms of an angular velocity which is a result of Brownian torque TB through a rotational mobility with the equation:

Where:
 
 

The only difference between rotational and translational diffusion in this case is that in the rotational diffusion, we have periodicity in the angle θ. As the particle is modelled as a sphere rotating in two dimensions, the space the particle can take is compact and finite, as the particle can rotate a distance of 2π before returning to its original position

 
We can create a conditional probability density, which is the probability of finding the vector u at the angle θ and time t given that it was at angle θ0 at time t=0 This is written as such:

 
The solution to this equation can be found through a Fourier series:

 
Where  is the Jacobian theta function of the third kind.

By using the equation

 
The conditional probability density function can be written as :

 
For short times after the starting point where t ≈ t0 and θ ≈ θ0, the formula becomes:

 
This means that at short times the conditional probability looks similar to translational diffusion, as both show extremely small perturbations near t0. However at long times, t » t0 , the behaviour of rotational diffusion is different to translational diffusion:

This is opposed to translational diffusion, which has no such periodicity.

This is because over long periods of time, the particle has had time rotate throughout the entire range of angles possible and as such, the angle θ could be any amount between θ0 and θ0 + 2 π. The probability is near-evenly distributed through each angle as at large enough times.
This can be proven through summing the probability of all possible angles.

See also
 Diffusion equation
 Perrin friction factors
 Rotational correlation time
 False diffusion

References

Further reading
 
 

Diffusion
Rotation